Rumia is a town in the Pomeranian Voivodeship of Poland. Other meanings include:

Places
Rumia (SKM stop)
Rumia Janowo (SKM stop)
Rumia (PKP station)
Lago Rumia, a lake in San Roberto, Italy

Botany 
Rumia (plant), a genus of plants in the family Apiaceae

Other
Rumia, a character in two Touhou Project video games